Stanley or Stan Walker may refer to:

 Stanley Walker (cricketer) (1908–1993), English cricketer
 Stanley Walker (editor) (1898–1962), editor of the New York Herald Tribune
 Stanley T. Walker (1922–2013), American non-commissioned officer and Olympic biathlete
 Stanley C. Walker (1923–2001), Democratic member of the Virginia Senate
Stanley Walker (murder victim)
Stan Walker (born 1990), Australian born New Zealand singer and actor, winner of Australian Idol 
Stan Walker (Will & Grace), fictional character